is a Japanese voice actor.

Filmography

Television animation
Cat's Eye (1983) (Domon)
Dragon Quest: The Adventure of Dai (1991) (Baduck)
Yu Yu Hakusho (1992) (Risho)
Mahōjin Guru Guru (1994) (Bajāni)
Hikaru no Go (2002) (Mr. Shu)
One Piece (2003) (Ben Beckman (2nd voice), Masira)
Death Note (2006) (David Hoope)
The Story of Saiunkoku (2007) (Dr. Yō)

ONA
Resident Evil: Infinite Darkness (2021) (Wilson)

OVA
Mobile Suit Gundam 0083: Stardust Memory (1991) (Adamski Harida)
Legend of the Galactic Heroes (1992) (Grünemann)

Theatrical animation
Mobile Suit Gundam II: Soldiers of Sorrow (2000) (Seki)
Stand By Me Doraemon (2014) (Yoshio Minamoto)
Stand by Me Doraemon 2 (2020) (Yoshio Minamoto)
One Piece Film: Red (2022) (Ben Beckman)

Video games
Langrisser (????) (Hawkings)
Rogue Galaxy (????) (Burton Willis, Yuvan)
Skylanders: Spyro's Adventure (????) (Rizzo)
Skylanders: Giants (????) (Rizzo)

TokusatsuChoukou Senshi Changéríon (????) (Kuuretsuki)

Web animationMegumi (????) (Administration official)

Dubbing roles

Live-action
John KassirTales from the Crypt (The Crypt Keeper)Tales from the Crypt: Demon Knight (The Crypt Keeper)Tales from the Crypt: Bordello of Blood (The Crypt Keeper)Tales from the Crypt Presents: Ritual (The Crypt Keeper)
Jeffrey TamborThere's Something About Mary (Sully)The Hangover (Sid Garner)The Hangover Part II (Sid Garner)The Hangover Part III (Sid Garner)Alien 3 (Walter Golic (Paul McGann))America's Sweethearts (Dave Kingman (Stanley Tucci))Babylon A.D. (Dr. Arthur Darquandier (Lambert Wilson))Billy Madison (Eric Gordon (Bradley Whitford))Black Christmas (Professor Gelson (Cary Elwes))Blue Steel (Robber (Tom Sizemore))Bound (Shelly (Barry Kivel))Bulworth (Graham Crockett (Paul Sorvino))Commando (1989 TV Asashi edition) (Henriques (Charles Meshack))Cube (David Worth (David Hewlett))Dae Jang Geum (Yeonsangun of Joseon)Eastern Condors (Lung Yeung (Haing S. Ngor))Everwood (Doctor Abbott (Tom Amandes))Exit Wounds (2004 NTV edition) (Vice President (Christopher Lawford))Fantastic Beasts: The Secrets of Dumbledore (Anton Vogel (Oliver Masucci))Fargo (V.M. Varga (David Thewlis))Final Destination (2002 TV Asahi edition) (Ken Browning (Robert Wisden))The Frighteners (Special Agent Milton Dammers (Jeffrey Combs))The Godfather (2001 DVD and 2008 Blu-ray editions) (Tom Hagen (Robert Duvall))The Godfather Part II (2001 DVD and 2008 Blu-ray editions) (Tom Hagen (Robert Duvall))Homicide: Life on the Street (John Munch (Richard Belzer))The Hunt for Red October (Skip Tyler (Jeffrey Jones))John Q. (Lester Matthews (Eddie Griffin))Last Christmas (Ivan Andrich (Boris Isaković))The Legend of Tarzan (The British Prime Minister (Jim Broadbent))Lucky Stars Go Places (Sandy (Richard Ng))Milk Money (Waltzer (Malcolm McDowell))Mission: Impossible (William Donloe (Rolf Saxon))Mission: Impossible 2 (2006 TV Asahi edition) (Billy Baird (John Polson))The Mummy (Jonathan Carnahan (John Hannah))The Mummy Returns (Jonathan Carnahan (John Hannah))The Mummy: Tomb of the Dragon Emperor (Jonathan Carnahan (John Hannah))New Fist of Fury (Hung (Han Ying-chieh))Nineteen Eighty-Four (Syme (James Walker))Ocean's Twelve (2007 NTV edition) (Livingston Dell (Eddie Jemison))Pay It Forward (Eugene Simonet (Kevin Spacey))Platoon (1998 DVD edition) (Sergeant O'Neill (John C. McGinley))Platoon (1989 TV Asahi edition) (Doc)The Protector (Superintendent Whitehead)The Rink (Her Father (James T. Kelley))Road to Perdition (Alexander Rance (Dylan Baker))The Rock (2000 TV Asahi edition) (Captain Hendrix (John C. McGinley))The Saint (Dr. Lev Naumovich Botkin (Henry Goodman))The Sentinel (President John Ballentine (David Rasche))The Siege (Frank Haddad (Tony Shalhoub))Six Feet Under (George Sibley (James Cromwell))Sniper 2 (Pavel)Stargate SG-1 (Apophis (Peter Williams))S.W.A.T. (Captain II Tom Fuller (Larry Poindexter))Teenage Mutant Ninja Turtles II: The Secret of the Ooze (Phil)Thunderbirds (Parker (Ron Cook))Ultraman: The Ultimate Hero (Dada)Vacancy (Mason (Frank Whaley))Vacancy 2: The First Cut (Gordon (David Moscow))White Squall (McCrea (John Savage))

AnimationBatman: The Animated Series (Arkady Duvall)G.I. Joe: The Movie (Beachhead)Cars 3 (River Scott)Rango (Señor Flan)Toonsylvania'' (Dr. Vic Frankenstein)

References

External links
 
Aruno Tahara at Aigumi

1949 births
Japanese male video game actors
Japanese male voice actors
Living people
People from Shibuya
20th-century Japanese male actors
21st-century Japanese male actors